Clubiona nemorum is a sac spider species found in Réunion.

See also 
 List of Clubionidae species

References

External links 

Clubionidae
Spiders of Réunion
Spiders described in 2004